Ningbo University Station is an elevated metro station in Ningbo, Zhejiang, China. It situates on Ningzhen Road, on the west of main entrance of Ningbo University. Construction of the station starts in middle 2012 and opened to service in September 26, 2015.

Exits 

Ningbo University Station has 2 exits.

References 

Railway stations in Zhejiang
Railway stations in China opened in 2015
Ningbo Rail Transit stations